Johann Matthias Schröckh (July 26, 1733 – August 1, 1808) was an Austrian-German historian and literary scholar born in Vienna. He was a grandson to Pietist preacher Matthias Bel (1684-1749).

In 1751 he began his studies at the University of Göttingen, where he had as instructors, church historian Johann Lorenz von Mosheim (1693-1755) and Orientalist Johann David Michaelis (1717-1791). He continued his education at the University of Leipzig, earning his master's degree in 1755. During the following year he received his habilitation, and in 1762 became an associate professor of philosophy. Later he relocated to the University of Wittenberg, where in 1775 he was appointed professor of history.

Known for his prodigious literary output, Schröckh was the author of acclaimed works involving universal history, church history, history books for children, biographical studies, et al. His main work involved the 35-volume Christliche Kirchengeschichte (Christian Church History, 1768-1803) and its sequel Christliche Kirchengeschichte seit der Reformation (Christian Church History since the Reformation 1804-1812, 10 volumes), with the last two volumes being prepared by Heinrich Gottlieb Tzschirner (1778-1828).

Selected publications
 Abbildungen und Lebensbeschreibungen berühmter Gelehrten (Images and biographies of famous scholars), 1764
 Lehrbuch der allgemeinen Weltgeschichte zum Gebrauche bei dem ersten Unterrichte der Jugend (Textbook of general world history for use as first lessons for young people), 1774
 Historia religionis et ecclesiae christianae, 1777
 Allgemeine Weltgeschichte für Kinder (General world history for children), 1779-1784
 Einleitung zur Universalhistorie: Umarbeitung von Hilmar Curas (Introduction of universal history: revision of Hilmar Curas), 1757
 Christliche Kirchengeschichte (Christian church history); 35 volumes, 1768–1803
 Christliche Kirchengeschichte seit der Reformation (Christian church history since the Reformation); with HG Tzschirner, 1804–1812.

References
  English translation
 Parts of this article are based on a translation of an article from the German Wikipedia.

1733 births
1808 deaths
Writers from Vienna
German historians of religion
Austrian historians
Historians of Christianity
Academic staff of the University of Wittenberg
Academic staff of Leipzig University
German male non-fiction writers